Fool's Gold Records is an independent record label based in Brooklyn, New York, United States. The label is known for its annual series of Day Off concerts across the US and Canada.

History 
Fool’s Gold Records was founded in 2005 by DJs A-Trak and Nick Catchdubs. It established itself with releases bridging the worlds of all music genres together to the world while being dubbed an "indie innovator" by Billboard and a "tastemaker" label by The New York Times, and "one of the most influential indies in the music business" by Pitchfork. It moved to Universal Music Group & Caroline Distribution for new distribution.

Roster 

 100s
 A-Trak
 Alexander Robotnick
 Alvin Risk
 Anna Lunoe
 Ape Drums
 Bag Raiders
 Cardo
 Brockhampton
 Carnage
 Chromeo
 Chris Crack
 Congorock
 The Count & Sinden
 Crookers
 Cubic Zirconia
 D.O.D
 Danny Brown
 Donnis
 Duck Sauce
 Flosstradamus
 Giraffage
 Jokers of the Scene
 Just Blaze
 Kavinsky
 Kid Cudi
 Kid Sister
 Laidback Luke
 Lil B
 McLane
 Meyhem Lauren
 NAPT
 Nick Catchdubs
 Oliver
 Onra
 Party Supplies
 Ricky Blaze
 RL Grime
 Rome Fortune
 Run the Jewels
 Sleepy Tom
 Style of Eye
 Sweet Valley
 Ta-ku
 Tchami
 The Cool Kids
 The Suzan
 Tommy Trash
 Trackademicks
 Treasure Fingers
 World's Fair

2016 Concert Series 
The New York Edition of the 2016 Concert Series features included Migos, A-Trak, Lil Yachty, Dave East, Juelz Santana, Leaf and Nick Catchdubs. The New York event commenced on August 20, then Miami on September 17, and LA on September 25.

References

External links 
 

American independent record labels
Companies based in New York City
Record labels established in 2007